Nashe Radio (Our Radio, pronounced Nashe radio) is a Russian Rock music radio station. It was designed to promote Russian rock bands, as opposed to pop and Western music. Nashe is based in Moscow and broadcast in every major Russian city as well as through the internet stream. It was founded in 1998 by former Radio Maximum producer .

Popular bands aired on Nashe include Zemfira, Aria, DDT, Kino, Splin, Bi-2, and many others, including Ukrainian and Belarusian bands, which are never considered foreign. The music style ranges from pop rock to heavy metal to folk rock and reggae, but Nashe's mainstream is 80's style classic rock and modern pop punk.

Nashe Radio chart, "Chart Dozen" (Chartova duzhina, play on "Devil's dozen", as the chart consists of 13 positions), updated weekly, is the major rock music chart in Russia. Since 2003, yearly results of chart are celebrated in annual indoor "Chart Dozen" festival. Since 2008, annual music award of the same name is presented to yearly chart winners on this festival.

Nashe Radio organize the largest annual open air rock festival in Russia, Nashestvie. It has been held since 1999, with the exceptions of 2007, 2020, 2021 and usually attracts from 50,000 to 100,000 spectators.

References

External links

Chart Dozen
Nashe Radio Fan club Moldova
Nashe Radio Fan-Club
Internet stream.

Radio stations established in 1998
Radio stations in Russia
Russian-language radio stations
Rock radio stations
Russian rock music